"Passion Fruit" is a 2007 Japanese song by Fujifabric and the group's ninth single. The single was released in two versions: a normal version and a limited edition first press version of 10,000 copies which featured the extra song "Cheese Burger", linked to a McDonald's Japan promotion. The song begins "夢の中で あやかしパッション" (yume no naka de ayakashi passhon..) "In a dream, awkward passion...".

Track listing
"Passion Fruit"
"Spider to Ballerina" (スパイダーとバレリーナ)
"Cheese Burger" (limited edition only)

Chart positions

References

2007 singles
2007 songs
Capitol Records singles